Struthio coppensi is an extinct species of ostrich located near Elisabethfeld, Namibia. This ostrich is believed to have lived during the Miocene, about 20 mya, and is the oldest member of the Struthio genus.

Footnotes

References
 
 

Cenozoic birds of Africa
Miocene birds
Extinct flightless birds
coppensi
Fossil taxa described in 1996